Lalor Park is a suburb of Sydney, in the state of New South Wales, Australia. Lalor Park is located 35 kilometres west of the Sydney central business district in the local government area of the City of Blacktown. Lalor Park is part of the Greater Western Sydney region. Lalor Park is commonly abbreviated as 'L.P'.

Population
According to the 2016 census of Population, there were 7,667 people in Lalor Park.
 Aboriginal and Torres Strait Islander people made up 3.7% of the population. 
 66.3% of people were born in Australia. The most common other countries of birth were Philippines 2.7%, New Zealand 2.7%, India 2.5% and England 1.8%.   
 70.3% of people only spoke English at home. Other languages spoken at home included Arabic 3.1%, Tagalog 1.7% and Mandarin 1.4%. 
 The most common responses for religion were Catholic 27.0%, No Religion 20.3% and Anglican 15.1%.

Commercial areas

Although the suburb is primarily residential there is a significant retail shopping precinct with about thirty shops including a newsagents, pharmacy and a small supermarket located at the junction of Northcott Road and Freeman Street.

Education
Lalor Park is the location of a number of educational institutions including:
 Lalor Park Preschool - A community based preschool
 Lalor Park Public School  - K-6 public primary school founded in 1959
 St Bernadette's Primary - systemic Catholic K-6 Primary School founded 1960 by the Sisters of St Joseph

Sport
Lalor Park Kookaburras Rugby League Club was established in 1959. They compete in the Parramatta Junior Rugby League. The club's colours are blue, brown and white. Home ground for the Kookaburras is Cavanagh Reserve (Venn Ave, Lalor Park). Lalor Park juniors that have played 1st grade in Australia include Mick Delroy, Feleti Mateo and Jorge Taufua and Brett Delaney.

Transport
The suburb is served by the Blacktown-Parklea branch of the North-West T-way and Sydney Trains Seven Hills railway station.

References

External links 

Suburbs of Sydney
City of Blacktown